Domus de Maria is a comune (municipality) in the Province of South Sardinia in the Italian region Sardinia, located about  southwest of Cagliari.  
  
Domus de Maria borders the following municipalities: Pula, Santadi, and Teulada.

See also
Capo Spartivento Lighthouse

References

External links 

Official website  
 Domus de Maria and Chia's Guide 

Cities and towns in Sardinia